is Toei's fourth entry to its Super Sentai metaseries. It was broadcast from February 2, 1980 to January 31, 1981, replacing Battle Fever J and was replaced by Taiyo Sentai Sun Vulcan. The title given to this series for international distribution by Toei is Denjiman, Electric Fighters.

Plot 
3,000 years ago, the Vader Clan, led by Queen Hedrian, devastated the planet Denji. Denji Land, an island from Denji, landed on Earth. In modern times, the computer of Denji Land awoke the Denji Dog IC when it detected the Vader Clan approaching Earth. IC found five young people (who may or may not be descendants of the Denji people) to become the Denjiman in order to defend Earth, the Vader Clan's next target.

Characters

Denjiman 
The titular Denjiman are the first Super Sentai team to use a personal transformation device carried on their person (see below). Their costumes are the first to use helmets with translucent materials for visors (although some exterior footage shows their helmets with perforated visors as was the practice with previous Super Sentai series).

 / : A teacher of karate and other sports to children at the Athletic Club. Twenty years after Denjiman ended, Ippei appeared along with 23 other Red Rangers summoned by Liveman's Red Falcon, in Hyakujuu Sentai Gaoranger vs. Super Sentai.
 / : A circus acrobat who teaches yoga and gymnastics at the Athletic Club and loves anpan. Years later, he becomes an anpan vendor, during which time he encounters the Gokaigers.
 / : An inventor and space researcher. He coaches calisthenics.
 / : A detective who lost his father to a Vader attack. He coaches boxing.
 / : A former tennis player who teaches swimming at the Athletic Club. Quit the team in the first episode rejoined at the end of episode two. She saw her coach burn to death because of the Vader Clan's first attack.

Allies
: Intelligent robot dog that came from planet Denji 3000 years ago to assemble the Denjiman team. He sacrificed his life to become a circuit for DaiDenjin in order to defeat the Omnipotent Monse.
: (12-51) A fellow Police Officer who is good friends and allies with Tatsyua.
 (Movie, 26 and 45): A survivor of planet Denji who visited Earth 3000 years ago, ordering a servant girl to defend the Earth with the rainbow stones. She left Earth to patrol the universe.

Vader Clan 
The  are invaders from another dimension with warped (to us) concepts of outer beauty. They intend to pollute and corrupt the Earth and its inhabitants to fit its unusual aesthetic.
: She hates inner beauty and wants to pollute the world. She finds happiness in human suffering. Cares deeply about her subjects. She vanished and sealed herself away in the North Pole, only to be found by Black Magma and revived as a cyborg under their control.
 (1-50): The field commander. He had a personal rivalry with Banriki Demon King. He was killed in battle when he interrupted the battle between the Denjimen and Banriki Demon King and Bankiri Monse. He grew giant and fought against the DaiDenjin but fell to the Denji Sword after the Denjiman used the Denji Ball. He was saluted by the Denjimen after being defeated.
: The female spies in silver and gold respectively. Keller can change into a shield, and Mirror a vanity mirror. Though Keller only turned into a shield once and that was to defend Queen Hedrian from an attack by Banriki Demon King. Sadly, it cost Keller her life, just as Mirror lost her life defending her Queen by blinding the Omnipotent Demon King.
 (37-51): A half-naked, musclebound space wanderer. He had a personal rivalry with General Hedrer. He attacked all the Denjiman until there was Denji Red, not injured in Episode 37 (Denji Yellow blinded in one eye, Denji Green injured by the wind, Denji Blue injured by hand in the water, and Denji Pink being injured by things blowing up around her and getting hit by a van). The others fought through their fight against him. In Episode 37, he grew after fighting Denjiman and was wounded after the Denjiman used Denji Boomerang. The Denjiman tried to give him the final blow with the Electronic Full Moon Cut in Episode 37. In Episode 48, he had Sakkalar to help him take over Vader Clan. He was turned into a human candle. With the help of the Bankiri Monse, he turned into a human and took back the Vader Clan.  He was finally killed off by the Denji Boomerang.
: The  grunts (foot soldiers) in black tights with skeletal designs. Armed with sickles. They can teleport from one spot to another.
 : The monsters hatched from eggs that all have a specific numbered belt buckle. The number on the buckle is usually the episode number minus one. They all also possess the ability to control their body's Cellular structure and are thus able to make themselves grow larger or smaller. Each time a Vader Monster was destroyed, a bust was made in its honor.

Episodes

Movie
The movie for Denshi Sentai Denjiman (written by Shozo Uehara and directed by Koichi Takemoto) premiered during the Toei Manga Matsuri film festival on July 12, 1980, the same day episode 24 aired. The character of Princess Denji makes her first appearance in this film and is referenced in two later episodes of the series (26 & 45), placing the events of this film sometime before Episode 26.

Cast
 Ippei Akagi: 
 Daigoro Oume: 
 Jun Kiyama: 
 Tatsuya Midorikawa: 
 Akira Momoi: 
 Queen Hedrian: 
 Denji Dog IC (Voice): Hisako Kyōda
 Officer Chieko Matsuo: Yukie Sakai
 Princess Denji: 
 General Hedrer: 
 Demon King Banriki: Hitoshi Oomae
 Mirror: Rie Yoshikawa
 Keller: Chiaki Kojo
 Constable Matsuo Tieko: Yukie Sakai
 Vader Monsters:  (Majority of Episodes)

Songs
Opening theme

Lyrics: Kazuo Koike
Composition & Arrangement: Michiaki Watanabe
Artist: Ken Narita, Koorogi '73

Ending theme

Lyrics: Kazuo Koike
Composition & Arrangement: Michiaki Watanabe
Artist: Ken Narita

International Broadcasts
Denshi Sentai Denjiman was the first Super Sentai series being broadcast in Thailand. The series was given a Thai dub and aired on Channel 7 and proved to be very popular amongst viewers which led to more broadcasts of Super Sentai series later in the country.
Denjiman was also broadcast in Italy, in some regional channels, where all episodes were dubbed in full. This along with Dai Sentai Goggle Five were the only two Super Sentai series to be dubbed and aired in the region.

Notes

References

External links
Official Denshi Sentai Denjiman website 

Super Sentai
1980 Japanese television series debuts
1981 Japanese television series endings
Television shows based on Marvel Comics
TV Asahi original programming
1980s Japanese television series